Touch was an American rock band from New York City formed in 1978. The band consisted of Mark Mangold (songwriter and keyboards), Glen Kithcart (drums), and Craig Brooks (guitars) who had all previously been in the band American Tears and had released three albums under Columbia Records. This lineup was completed by their bassist, Doug Howard.

History

1974 - 1979: American Tears, Signing to Atco 
In the early 1970s, Mark Mangold formed the keyboard-driven hard-rock band American Tears with bassist Gary Sonny and drummer Tommy Gunn before being signed onto Columbia Records. In 1974, this lineup released their debut album, Branded Bad which failed to chart on the Billboard 200 or produce any hit singles. In 1975, Gary Sonny was replaced by Greg Baze and this lineup released their second album Tear Gas which also failed to chart. In 1977, the band released their final album on Columbia, Powerhouse, which featured new members drummer Glen Kithcart, guitarist Craig Brooks, and bassist Kirk Powers. This album also did not chart and American Tears left Columbia. 

In 1978, the band reassembled changing their name to Touch, adding bassist Doug Howard to their lineup, and started making demos to get another record deal. They recorded a demo of "When the Spirit Moves You" at the Power Station which caught the attention of Deep Purple and Rainbow manager Bruce Payne who would help them get a deal with Atco.  Recording for their first album Touch then began with English producer Tim Friese-Greene and would be released in 1980.

1980: First Album
The first single from the album, "When The Spirit Moves You," reached #65 on the Billboard Hot 100 and #77 on Cashbox Top 100. The second single, "Don't You Know What Love Is," reached #69 on the Hot 100, #86 on Cashbox and number 1 in some other places. "Don't You Know What Love Is" was played heavily on AOR radio stations in the USA during the early 80s and did particularly well on a specialist Melody Maker chart in Great Britain. In 1981-82, the band also recorded a second album second that was produced by Todd Rundgren but it went unreleased.

Touch was the first band to play at the inaugural Monsters of Rock festival at Castle Donington racetrack in 1980. A live version of "Don't You Know What Love Is" also appeared on the compilation LP Monsters of Rock, documenting performances at the festival.

Post Break-up
Mark Mangold has continued to write and record with and for other artists, with one of his earliest collaborators being a then-relatively unknown musician named Michael Bolton.  This working relationship began when Mangold co-wrote and performed on Bolton's first solo hit, "Fool's Game," which was featured on the latter artist's self-titled 1983 solo album. The song "I Found Someone," another collaboration with Bolton, was initially recorded by Laura Branigan, though it ultimately became a top-10 hit for Cher.

Furthermore, Craig Brooks also joined Mangold in the studio for Michael Bolton's solo album. In addition to being a fellow co-writer on "Fool's Game," Brooks performed guitar and backing vocals for the album. The following year, he also contributed by singing on Roger Glover's solo album, Mask.

Doug Howard has also continued to perform, record and write with acts and artists such as Todd Rundgren, Edgar Winter, Stun Leer, and Roy Buchanan as well as a member of Rundgren's Utopia (Howard is co-writer of the Utopia hit "Feet Don't Fail Me Now" and managing partner of Lodestar Entertainment.

2014: Reformation
In 2014, Mangold was asked to play Touch songs with a band assembled by the Firefest Festival, including Swedish singer Göran Edman as the lead vocals along with other Swedish musicians. This lineup performed live at the Firefest in Nottingham, UK in October 2014.

2020—: New album
In 2020, Mangold announced that all four original members had reunited and were once again working on a new Touch album for release in late 2020. In October 2020, Mangold posted a new Touch song on their YouTube. The album, Tomorrow Never Comes, was later released on 6 March 2021.

Personnel
 Craig Brooks – guitars, vocals
 Mark Mangold – keyboards, vocals
 Doug Howard – bass guitar, vocals
 Glenn Kithcart – drums, percussion, vocals

Discography

Studio albums
 Touch (1980)
 Touch II (1982)
 Tomorrow Never Comes (2021)

Compilation albums
The Complete Works I & II (1998)

References

External links
MusicMight biography

Rock music groups from New York (state)
Musical groups established in 1978
Musical groups from New York City